Walter Rehberg (14 May 1900 in Geneva – 24 October 1957) was a Swiss concert pianist, composer and writer on musical subjects who was particularly active from the 1920s to 1950s.

Walter Rehberg came from a line of notable pianists. His grandfather was Friedrich Rehberg, a distinguished pianist, and his father Willy Rehberg (1863–1937). Walter studied under his father at Hoch Conservatory, Frankfurt, and at the University School of Music at Mannheim. He later received tuition from Eugen d'Albert. By 1924 he had composed piano sonatas, a violin sonata and other piano pieces. During the 1920s and 1930s he made recordings for Polydor/Brunswick records and in the 1940s he recorded for Decca.

Recordings (by 1936), Polydor numbers 
Liszt, Rhapsodie Espagnole, PD-95044-5
Liszt, Sonetta del Petrarca 104, PD-95045
Liszt, Ave Maria (Grove's no 33), PD-95043
Liszt, Eglogue, Années de Pélerinage 1st yr no 7, PD-25138
Liszt-Schubert, Valse-Caprice, Soirées de Vienne Set 1 no 6, PD-24993
Liszt, Consolation no 3, PD-95042
Mendelssohn, Spring song, PD-27229
Chopin, Polonaise-Fantaisie op 61, PD-25137-8
Brahms, Rhapsody B minor op 79 no 1, PD-90015
Brahms, Rhapsody G minor op 79 no 3, PD-90016
Brahms, Waltzes (selection), op 39, PD-25192
Strauss, Voices Of Spring, Concert paraphrase on the B Major waltz, PD-23737
Schubert, Piano Sonata no 11 G major (op 78) 3rd movt, PD-95049
Schubert, 'Wanderer' Fantasia, C major op 15, PD-95047-9
Schubert, Impromptu no 3 G major op 90 no 3, PD-95072
Schubert, Moment musical op 94 no 3, PD-95072
Schumann, Fantasie in C, Op. 17, PD-95039-42
Grieg, Wedding Day at Troldhaugen, PD-24989
Grieg, To Spring PD-27229
Sinding, Rustle of Spring, PD-24989
Rachmaninoff, Prelude in C sharp minor, PD-27229

Writings 
 G.F. Händel: Auswahl aus seinen Klavierwerken. Instruktive Ausgabe (Cotta, Stuttgart 1930).

Soon after the second war he published four biographical and musical studies, co-authored with Paula Rehberg. 
 Franz Schubert, sein Leben und Werk (Artemis-Verlag, Zurich 1946)
 Johannes Brahms, sein Leben und Werk (Artemis-Verlag, Zurich 1947)
 Frédéric Chopin, sein Leben und sein Werk (Artemis-Verlag, Zurich 1949)
 Robert Schumann, sein Leben und sein Werk (Artemis-Verlag, Zurich & Stuttgart 1954)

Sources 
R.D. Darrell, Gramophone Shop Encyclopedia of Recorded Music (New York 1936)
A. Eaglefield-Hull, Dictionary of Modern Music and Musicians (Dent, London 1924)
W. & P. Rehberg, works.

External links
Nachlass Walter Rehberg - Archives at Zentralbibliothek Zürich

1900 births
1957 deaths
Hoch Conservatory alumni
Swiss classical pianists
Swiss male composers
Swiss pianists
Musicians from Geneva
20th-century classical pianists
Male classical pianists
20th-century male musicians
20th-century Swiss composers